Hornsby Shire is a local government area situated in Northern Sydney (Upper North Shore), as well as parts of the Hills District, in the state of New South Wales, Australia.

The Mayor of Hornsby Shire is Cr Philip Ruddock, a member of the Liberal Party, who was elected on 9 September 2017.

Suburbs, towns and localities in the local government area 
Suburbs in the Hornsby Shire include:

Towns and localities in the Hornsby Shire are:

Demographics 
Aboriginal and Torres Strait Islander people made up 0.5 per cent of the population; significantly below the NSW and Australian averages of 2.9 and 2.8 per cent respectively. The median age of people in the Hornsby Shire was 40 years; slightly higher than the national median of 38 years. Children aged 0 – 14 years made up 19.5 per cent of the population and people aged 65 years and over made up 16.2 per cent of the population. Of people in the area aged 15 years and over, 58.8 per cent were married and 8.2 per cent were either divorced or separated.

At the 2016 census, the population in the Shire decreased by 9.04 per cent brought about predominately by an adjustment in local government boundaries. The median weekly income for residents within the Hornsby Shire was higher than the national average.

Council

Current composition and election method
Hornsby Shire Council is composed of ten Councillors, including the Mayor, for a fixed four-year term of office. The Mayor is directly elected while the nine other Councillors are elected proportionally as three separate wards, each electing three Councillors. The most recent election was held on 4 December 2021, and the makeup of the council, including the Mayor, is as follows:

The current Council, elected in 2021, in order of election by ward, is:

Past mayors and shire presidents

History

Hornsby Shire is the traditional lands occupied by the Darug and Kuringgai peoples of indigenous Australians. While the northern part of the Shire via the Hawkesbury River was visited by the first European settlers in late 1788, due to the Shire's rugged landscape permanent European settlement did not begin until almost half a century later.

Hornsby Shire got its name from the town of Hornsby at the eastern end of the Shire, is derived from convict-turned-Constable Samuel Horne, who earned distinction by capturing bushrangers Dalton and MacNamara on 22 June 1830. In return he was granted land in the locality known as "Hornsby Place".

Hornsby Shire has remained largely rural for many decades. The construction of the Main North railway line in the 1880s opened up the Shire to the rest of Sydney and also to Newcastle, but it was not until motor vehicles became commonplace in the 1950s that the southern part of the Shire truly became part of Sydney's suburbia. The Shire was incorporated as a local government authority on 6 March 1906.

A 2015 review of local government boundaries by the NSW Government Independent Pricing and Regulatory Tribunal recommended that Hornsby Shire merge with adjoining councils. The government considered two proposals. The outcome of the review was that the suburbs of Hornsby Shire Council south of the M2 joined an expanded Parramatta City Council. The NSW Government also gave in principle support for the Hornsby Shire suburbs north of the M2 to amalgamate with Ku-ring-gai Council. In July 2017, the Berejiklian government decided to abandon the forced merger of the Hornsby and Ku-ring-gai local government areas, along with several other proposed forced mergers. This failed merger resulted in the council losing lucrative area south of the M2 including Epping and Carlingford.

Heritage listings 
The Hornsby Shire has a number of heritage-listed sites, including:
 Brooklyn, Main Northern railway: Hawkesbury River railway station
 Cheltenham, 67 Cobran Road:  Ahimsa, Cheltenham
 Galston, 161 Main Road: Tunks Creek Bridge
 Galston, 11 School Road: Galston Congregational Church Pipe Organ
 Hornsby, 2a Manor Road (Rosamond Street): Mount Wilga House
 Hornsby, Old Man's Valley, off Quarry Road: Old Man's Valley Cemetery
 Normanhurst, 82-84 Pennant Hills Road: Gilligaloola
 Wahroonga, 9 Highlands Avenue: Highlands

Geography

Hornsby calls itself the 'Bushland Shire'. This is in reference to its location on a high ridge separating two expansive areas of natural bushland which consists of up to 70% of the total area: The Ku-ring-gai Chase National Park on the eastern side and the Berowra Valley Regional Park on the western side. These provide large areas of natural parkland that form a green belt running from Sydney at the south to the Hawkesbury River at the Shire's northern end. These parks are extremely popular with day-trippers from all areas of Sydney and provides diverse recreations such as bushwalking and boating.

The northern half of Hornsby Shire remains a semi-rural area, retaining a number of farmlands and market gardens. This area consists of small village settlements such as Mount Colah and Hornsby Heights. The village of Galston is the centre of this rural area.

The western part of the shire shares a  border with The Hills Shire and is separated from the rest of the Shire by national parks and the Galston Gorge.

The southern half of the Shire is urban, forming part of Sydney's suburbia on the North Shore and Northern Suburbs. Traditionally most of the Shire's residents live in free-standing houses, but in recent years a number of semi-detached housings as well as high-density apartments have appeared around Hornsby's central business district.

The Shire has several areas with industrial activity including Hornsby, Asquith and Thornleigh. The major commercial centres of the Shire, apart from Hornsby's central business district, are the suburbs of Pennant Hills and North Epping.

Local attractions in the Hornsby Shire include its easily accessible wilderness areas including part of the Great North Walk, parkland recreational facilities such as Fagan Park at Galston, Pennant Hills Park, Koala Park Sanctuary in West Pennant Hills, and the village of Brooklyn on the Hawkesbury River.

Hornsby Shire has four public libraries (at Hornsby, Pennant Hills, Berowra and Galston, two public swimming pools ("Aquatic Centres"), and a range of other sporting and community facilities.

See also

 Local government areas of New South Wales

References

External links
Hornsby Shire Website
  [CC-By-SA]

 
1906 establishments in Australia
Hornsby